Vera Micaelsen (4 December 1974 – 28 October 2018) was a Norwegian television journalist and author.

Career 
Micaelsen worked twelve years in NRK. There, she was the presenter for shows such as Jubalong, Holger Nielsens Metode, VeraVera, Rugekassa and Go' elg. She also worked with Friday and Saturday entertainment, documentaries and other children and youth programs in radio and television. She was also a columnist for Aftenposten Junior.

Micaelsen wrote several books for and about children. She debuted as a youth book writer with the book Hyperpubertet at Aschehoug publisher in 2013. She was employed as a long film consultant at Norsk Filmfond. She was employed as a senior advisor in the Den kulturelle skolesekken.

Personal life and death
Micaelsen was married to director and screenwriter Atle Knudsen with whom she had three daughters. She was also the sister-in-law of footballers Jon and Mari Knudsen.

In February 2014, Micaelsen was diagnosed with cervical cancer with proliferation. She received radiation therapy which apparently was successful, but the cancer came back in the fall of 2017 and Micaelsen died on 28 October 2018.

Bibliography 
 2003: 1000 ting å gjøre sammen med barna
 2005: På månen spiser de kameler - filosofi for barn
 2008: Supermamma monstermamma - historier om familiekaos og småbarnsliv
 2009: Kua som falt ned fra himmelen - forunderlige fortellinger fra virkeligheten
 2011: Å klemme fingeren i døra - en bok om følelser 
 2013: Hyperpubertet
 2014: Discosatan

References 

1974 births
2018 deaths
Television people from Oslo
NRK people
Norwegian radio personalities
Norwegian television presenters
20th-century Norwegian women writers
Norwegian women children's writers
Norwegian children's writers
Deaths from cancer in Norway
Deaths from cervical cancer
Norwegian women television presenters
Norwegian women journalists
Writers from Oslo